Treptichnus (formerly named Phycodes, Manykodes by J. Dzik, and also known as Trichophycus) is  the preserved burrow of an animal. As such, it is regarded as the earliest widespread complex trace fossil. Its earliest appearance, around 542 mya, which was contemporaneous with the last of the Ediacaran biota, is used to help define the dividing line, considered geologically at 541 mya, between the Ediacaran and Cambrian periods. It is last seen in the fossil record during the Cenomanian (99.7 Ma).

Description

Treptichnus pedum has a fairly complicated and distinctive burrow pattern: along a central, sometimes sinuous or looping burrow it made successive probes upward through the sediment in search of nutrients, generating a trace pattern reminiscent of a fan or twisted rope. The organism that left such traces is considered more complex than earlier Ediacaran biota; and these trace fossils, which occur worldwide, are usually found in strata above those.

Since only its burrows have been found, it is presumed that the Treptichnus animal lacked any hard anatomical features, such as shells or bones.  Its morphology and relationship to modern animals is therefore unknown, and some dispute even its inclusion within the animal kingdom.  Despite this lack of fossil evidence, surface trails produced by modern priapulid worms exhibit the same probing morphology as Treptichnus, suggesting a close anatomical relationship between the trace-maker and modern priapulids.

Etymology
The name Treptichnus pedum means "turned-trail (Greek) of feet (Latin)".

References

Cambrian life
Burrow fossils
Index fossils